Greta Williams was a celebrated English operatic soprano and contralto, and occasional pianist of the Victorian era.  Born in London, she studied piano under Edwin Holland and Alberto Randegger at the Royal Academy of Music, and made numerous appearances, both as an instrumentalist and a singer, at the Hallé Concerts, Royal Albert Hall, Queen's Hall and other venues.

She is also remembered as a heroine of the 1899 wreck of the SS Stella, in which 77 people perished.  During the 14 hours she and other survivors waited in open boats for their rescuers, she quelled the fears of the passengers and crew by singing "O, Rest in the Lord".

References

Operatic contraltos
Pupils of Alberto Randegger
Singers from London
19th-century births
Year of birth missing
Year of death missing
English operatic sopranos
English contraltos
Alumni of the Royal Academy of Music
19th-century English singers
19th-century British women singers
20th-century English singers
20th-century British women singers
20th-century English women
20th-century English people
19th-century English women